Trapped in the Closet: The Confessionals is a miniseries posted on the R. Kelly Vevo YouTube channel. The miniseries is the confessionals from Chapters 23 - 33 with added clips from the Trapped in the Closet series. It was used to promote the new chapters (23 - 33) that came out at the time. The only confessionals not used in the series yet are Cathy, Rosie, and Randolph.

References

American documentary films